The Welts is a 2004 Polish film directed by Magdalena Piekorz. It was Poland's submission to the 77th Academy Awards for the Academy Award for Best Foreign Language Film, but was not accepted as a nominee.

Cast
Michał Żebrowski - Wojciech Winkler
Jan Frycz - Andrzej Winkler
Agnieszka Grochowska - Tania
Waclaw Adamczyk - Wojciech Winkler (12 years)
Borys Szyc - Bartosz
Alan Andersz - Bartosz (12 years)
Leszek Piskorz - Priest
Jan Peszek - Editor-in-chief
Dorota Kamińska 
Damian Damięcki 
Tadeusz Bradecki – doctor
Mikołaj Grabowski – doctor
Krystyna Rutkowska-Ulewicz 
Maria Maj - teacher
Joanna Pierzak - teacher
Violetta Arlak 
Marcin Bosak 
Wojciech Mecwaldowski 
Borys Jaźnicki

References

External links

See also
List of submissions to the 77th Academy Awards for Best Foreign Language Film

2004 films
Polish drama films
2000s Polish-language films